In algebra, a polynomial map or polynomial mapping  between vector spaces over an infinite field k is a polynomial in linear functionals with coefficients in k; i.e., it can be written as

When V, W are finite-dimensional vector spaces and are viewed as algebraic varieties, then a polynomial mapping is precisely a morphism of algebraic varieties.

One fundamental outstanding question regarding polynomial mappings is the Jacobian conjecture, which concerns the sufficiency of a polynomial mapping to be invertible.

See also 
Polynomial functor

References 
Claudio Procesi (2007) Lie Groups: an approach through invariants and representation, Springer, .

Algebra